Main Roads in Lesotho are a class of trunk roads and freeways which connect major cities. They form the highest category in the Lesotho route numbering scheme, and are designated with route numbers beginning with "A", from A1 to A99.

Table of routes

Trunk roads

References 

Roads in Lesotho
Lesotho
Lists of buildings and structures in Lesotho
Lesotho transport-related lists